The Chien Lung class of submarine, also known as the Hai Lung (Sea Dragon) class, was manufactured in the Netherlands for the Republic of China (Taiwan) and is currently in service with its navy. They are a modified version of the Dutch Navy's  which itself is based on the US .
A new class of submarines being built by Taiwan's Indigenous Defense Submarine program, will eventually replace them.

History
The Republic of China (Taiwan) ordered two submarines, each based on the Dutch Zwaardvis design, in September 1981. The keels for both submarines were laid down by dock and yard company Wilton Fijenoord b.v Schiedam in December 1982, though initial construction of the submarines was delayed due to the builder's financial instability, work resumed in 1983. Both submarines were launched in 1986, Hai Lung on October 6 and Hai Hu on December 10. Sea trials for Hai Lung began in March 1987 and Hai Hu began its sea trials in January 1988. Both ships were transported to Taiwan on board a heavy dock vessel. Hai Hu was commissioned for service on October 9, 1987 and Hai Lung followed on April 9, 1988. The deal for the submarines also included power station components and gas liquifaction plants.

More boats in this class were planned, and in October 1983 the Dutch government held talks with Taiwan in which the ordering of two extra submarines was discussed. The order worth ƒ800 million was to be paid for 50% by investments of Taiwan in the Netherlands in the form of civil orders. However, the deal fell through after mainland China pressured the Dutch government. An order for four more submarines was also turned down by the Netherlands government in 1992 after China downgraded diplomatic ties with the Dutch.

Design
The Hai Lung-class submarines are based on an improved Zwaardvis-class design. The design was modified to include the placement of noise-producing machinery on a false deck with spring suspension for silent running. As built the class featured an Elbit TIMNEX 4CH(V2) electronic support measures (ESM) system.

Tasks
The Hai Lung-class submarines are aimed at providing Taiwan the capability to deter Chinese naval blockades and to ensure that its sea lanes remain open, thus protecting the trade on which the island depends. In addition, both submarines could be used to block Chinese ports but are unlikely to be capable of countering China's submarine fleet.

Planned upgrade

In 2005, it was reported that the Chien Lung-class submarines would be upgraded to be capable of launching the UGM-84 Harpoon anti-ship missile. US DoD notified the United States Congress of the sale to Taiwan of 32 UGM-84 Harpoon Block II missiles, along with two weapon control systems, other associated equipment and services, in 2008. The delivery of the Harpoon anti-ship missiles started in 2013 and was completed in 2016. The upgrade allows the Hai Lung-class submarines to be able to attack targets from the sea, such as the Port of Shanghai, as well as nuclear submarines at the secret naval base in Yulin on the island of Hainan. The submarines can now attack targets both at sea and on land with Harpoon missiles.

Boats

See also
 List of submarine classes in service

References

External links 

 Hai Lung (Sea Dragon)-class (Zwaardvis) Submarine - Globalsecurity
 Fast-attack boat efficacy questioned - Taipei Times
 Taiwan Navy Emphasizing Domestic Shipbuilding Program in Ongoing Maritime Restructure - USNI News
 Taiwan seeking Aegis destroyers from U.S.: report - Reuters
 Absalon Class Littoral Support Ships - Defense Media Network
 Why Taiwan Needs Submarines - The Heritage Foundation
 Chien Lung/Hai Lung type for Taiwan - Dutch Submarines

Submarine classes
 
 
1986 ships
Ships built by Wilton-Fijenoord
Netherlands–Taiwan relations